Group 1 consisted of five of the 34 teams entered into the European zone: Albania, Austria, Bulgaria, Finland, and West Germany. These five teams competed on a home-and-away basis for two of the 14 spots in the final tournament allocated to the European zone, with the group's winner and runner-up claiming those spots.

Standings

Results

Notes

External links 
Group 1 Detailed Results at RSSSF

1
1980–81 in Albanian football
1981–82 in Albanian football
1980–81 in Austrian football
1981–82 in Austrian football
1980–81 in Bulgarian football
1981–82 in Bulgarian football
1980 in Finnish football
1981 in Finnish football
1980–81 in German football
1981–82 in German football